Anginda peak (അങ്ങിണ്ട മുടി) is a mountain in the Nilgiri Hills of the Western Ghats on the border of the Nilgiris District of Tamil Nadu and Palakkad district of Kerala. It is just south of Sispara pass, and forms the southernmost boundary of Mukurthi National Park in Tamil Nadu. There is an unobstructed view of Anginda from the 30 m observation tower at Sairandhri Visitors Center. The Kunthipuzha River, which is a tributary of Bharathappuzha originates from the Anginda peak.

There is a population of the endemic and endangered Nilgiri laughing-thrush at the Anginda-Sispara belt inside the Silent Valley National Park. Serious trekkers can take a  4-day trek route, starting from Mukkali through Sairandhri, Poochipara, Walakkad and Sispara to Anginda.

Citations

References
.

Nair, Sajita (2005) Valley of Silence. Gateway for India. retrieved 6 September 2007.

Mountains of the Western Ghats
Mountains of Kerala
Two-thousanders of Asia